Andreas Aulie (17 November 1897 – 17 January 1990) was a Norwegian jurist.

Biography
Aulie was born in Kristiania (now Oslo), Norway. He was the son of Nils Baltazar Aulie (1867–1951) and Martha Valstad (1872–1966). His brother was artist and instructor, Reidar Aulie (1904-1977). He attended Frogner Gymnasium and graduated from the University of Oslo  in 1920.  In 1922, he married  Ebba Nannestad (1893–1988) and divorced her in 1933. He  moved to Bergen when he became a police officer in 1922.  From 1930 he was a police chief. He was appointed Public Prosecutor for Bergen and Hordaland in 1939.

During the Occupation of Norway by Nazi Germany, he left the country when he was needed in London to establish  Norwegian police force preparedness for liberation after the end of World War II. His wife and children were later brought out of the country.  In 1943, Aulie was appointed as the National Police Chief.  He re-entered occupied Norway several times to conduct meetings with members of Milorg.
He served as chief of police of Norway from 1945 to 1946. He was Director General of Public Prosecutions from 1946, a position he held for the next twenty-one years.

Aulie was a commander of the star in the Order of St. Olav. He was also made a commander of the Order of Vasa and was made an honorary member  of the Order of the British Empire.

References

1897 births
1990 deaths
Police officers from Oslo
Norwegian police chiefs
Commanders of the Order of Vasa
Honorary Members of the Order of the British Empire
Recipients of the St. Olav's Medal
Lawyers from Oslo